Alexander Pollock Donaldson (4 December 1890 – 1972) was a Scottish footballer, who played for numerous teams in England as well as the Scotland national team. An outside-forward, he stayed with Bolton Wanderers from 1912 to 1921, and also spent time with Sunderland, Manchester City, Chorley, and Ashton National. After his football career ended, he opened a sports shop in Gorton, Manchester.

Club career
Donaldson played for minor teams Belgrave (Leicester), Balmoral United and Ripley Athletic (Derbyshire) before being given his big chance with a trial at Sheffield United which was not a success. However, in 1912 he was signed by Bolton Wanderers from Ripley Athletic and made his debut against Chelsea on 7 September 1912. The Trotters finished the 1912–13 season in eighth place in the First Division. Wanderers finished in sixth position in 1913–14 and ended the 1914–15 campaign in 17th place. The Football League was suspended during World War I, and Donaldson guested for Leicester Fosse and Port Vale. He returned to Burnden Park after the war, helping the club to sixth and third-place finishes in 1919–20 and 1920–21. He made a total of 139 league and seven FA Cup appearances for Bolton, scoring six goals. He then signed with Manchester City via Sunderland. He played just seven First Division games for the Citizens in 1923–24. After leaving Maine Road he played non-league football for Chorley and Ashton National.

International career
Donaldson very nearly played for England before being capped by Scotland. While heading for an English international trial match in Sunderland on 21 January 1914, Donaldson revealed that he was actually born in Scotland, having moved to Central England in his teens after the death of his father.

He earned his first Scotland cap against Wales on 28 February 1914, in a goalless draw at Celtic Park. On 14 March, he played in a 1–1 draw with Ireland at Windsor Park. On 4 April, he played in a 3–1 victory over England at Hampden Park; the game secured Scotland a second-place finish in the 1914 British Home Championship. No official matches took place for six years because of World War I, though Donaldson did take part in three unofficial wartime internationals. He returned to international football in the 1920 British Home Championship, playing in the 3–0 home victory over Ireland on 13 March. On 10 April, he scored in a 5–4 defeat to England at Hillsborough. He won his sixth and final cap on 4 March 1922, in a 2–1 home win over Ireland.

Statistics

Club statistics
Source:

International statistics

Honours
Scotland
British Home Championship: 1922

References

1890 births
1972 deaths
Sportspeople from East Renfrewshire
People from Barrhead
Scottish footballers
Scotland international footballers
Scotland wartime international footballers
Association football wingers
Association football forwards
Bolton Wanderers F.C. players
Leicester City F.C. wartime guest players
Port Vale F.C. wartime guest players
Sunderland A.F.C. players
Manchester City F.C. players
Chorley F.C. players
Ashton National F.C. players
English Football League players
Date of death missing